Mirta Raquel Pico Enciso (born 8 February 1994) is a Paraguayan footballer who plays as a forward for Club Sol de América and the Paraguay women's national team.

International career
Pico represented Paraguay at the 2014 South American U-20 Women's Championship and the 2014 FIFA U-20 Women's World Cup. She made her senior debut on 3 August 2019 against Jamaica in the 2019 Pan American Games.

References

External links

1994 births
Living people
Women's association football forwards
Paraguayan women's footballers
Paraguay women's international footballers
Pan American Games competitors for Paraguay
Footballers at the 2019 Pan American Games
Club Sol de América footballers
Paraguayan women's futsal players
20th-century Paraguayan women
21st-century Paraguayan women